Nilsson is a Swedish surname and the fourth most common surname in Sweden. The name is a patronymic meaning "Nils's son". Nils was a very common name, especially in 19th century Sweden.

Geographical distribution
As of 2014, 89.8% of all known bearers of the surname Nilsson were residents of Sweden, 2.6% of the United States, 2.0% of Denmark and 1.4% of Norway.

In Sweden, the frequency of the surname was higher than national average (1:58) in the following counties:
 1. Skåne (1:26)
 2. Blekinge (1:30)
 3. Kalmar (1:33)
 4. Värmland (1:37)
 5. Norrbotten (1:38)
 6. Halland (1:39)
 7. Kronoberg (1:39)
 8. Jämtland (1:46)
 9. Gotland (1:46)
 10. Västerbotten (1:52)

People
 Anders Nilsson (disambiguation)
 Andreas Nilsson (disambiguation)
 Anna Q. Nilsson (1888–1974), a Swedish actor
 Anna T. Nilsson (1869–1947), Swedish educator and peace activist
 Anton Nilson (1887–1989), a Swedish Communist, active in the Russia Revolution
 Aurora Nilsson (1894–1972), a Swedish writer
 Bengt Nilsson (born 1954), a Swedish actor
 Birgit Nilsson (1918–2005), a Swedish soprano
 Bo Nilsson (1937–2018) a Swedish composer and lyricist
 Bob Nilsson (born 1960), an Australian minor league and ABL pitcher
 Cecilia Nilsson (born 1979), a Swedish hammer thrower
 Christina Nilsson (1843–1921), a Swedish operatic soprano
 Dave Nilsson (born 1969), an Australian professional baseball player, coach, manager
 Ebba Tove Elsa Nilsson (born 1987) a Swedish singer, songwriter known as Tove Lo
 Fredrik Olaus Nilsson (1809–1881), a Swedish Baptist pioneer
 Gary Nilsson (born 1963), an Australian minor league and ABL pitcher
 Gunnar Nilsson (1948–1978), a Swedish racing car driver
 Harry Nilsson (1941–1994), an American singer and songwriter, often known simply as Nilsson
 Ida Göthilda Nilsson (1840–1920), a Swedish sculptor
 Ida Nilsson (born 1981), Swedish trailrunner and ski mountaineer
 Ingemar Nilsson (born 1956), Swedish politician
 Janne Nilsson (1882–1938), a Swedish politician
 Jesse Nilsson (1977–2003), a Canadian actor
 Joakim Nilsson (disambiguation)
 Jonna Emily Lee Nilsson (born 1981), a Swedish singer
 Kent Nilsson (born 1956), a Swedish ice hockey player
 Kjell Nilsson (disambiguation)
 Kristina Nilsson (born 1965), Swedish politician
 Lars Nilsson (designer) (born 1966), a Swedish fashion designer
 Lennart Nilsson (1922–2017), a Swedish photographer
 Lennart Nilsson (born 1944), Swedish politician
 Lina Nilsson, a Swedish football player
 Malin Nilsson (born 1973), a Swedish freestyle swimmer
 Magnus Nilsson (born 1984), a Swedish chef
 Martin P. Nilsson (1874–1967), a Swedish philologist and historian of religion
 Mats Nilsson (born 1956), a Swedish Air Force officer
 Molly Nilsson (born 1984), a Swedish singer-songwriter and musician 
 Nils Nilsson (disambiguation)
 Norma Jean Nilsson (born 1938), American actress
 Pål Nils Nilsson (1929–2002), Swedish photographer and filmmaker
 Robert Nilsson (born 1985), an ice hockey player
 Roland Nilsson (born 1963), a Swedish football player
 Svante Nilsson (1460–1512), a regent of Sweden
 Sven Nilsson (disambiguation)
 Tommy Nilsson (born 1960), a Swedish musician
 Ulf Nilsson (1948–2021), Swedish writer
 Zandor Nilsson (1913–1973), a Swedish chess player

See also
 Neilson (name)
 Nielsen (disambiguation)
 Nilson

References

Swedish-language surnames
Patronymic surnames
Surnames from given names